The Natives Land Act, 1913 (subsequently renamed Bantu Land Act, 1913 and Black Land Act, 1913; Act No. 27 of 1913) was an Act of the Parliament of South Africa that was aimed at regulating the acquisition of land.
According to the Encyclopædia Britannica:
"The Natives’ Land Act of 1913 defined less than one-tenth of South Africa as Black “reserves” and prohibited any purchase or lease of land by Blacks outside the reserves. The law also restricted the terms of tenure under which Blacks could live on white-owned farms."

Overview
The Natives Land Act of 1913 was the first major piece of segregation legislation passed by the Union Parliament. It was replaced in 1991. The act decreed that natives were not allowed to buy land from whites and vice versa. Exceptions had to be approved by the Governor-General. The native areas left initially totaled less than 10% of the entire land mass of the Union, which was later expanded to 13%.

The Act further prohibited the practice of serfdom or sharecropping. It also protected existing agreements or arrangement of land hired or leased by both parties.

This land was in "native reserve" areas, which meant it was under "communal" tenure vested in African chiefs: it could not be bought, sold or used as surety. Outside such areas, perhaps of even greater significance for black farming was that the Act forbade black tenant farming on white-owned land. Since so many black farmers were sharecroppers or labour tenants that had a devastating effect, but its full implementation was not immediate. The Act strengthened the chiefs, who were part of the state administration, but it forced many blacks in the "white" areas into wage labour.

Content of the Act
The following is a brief description of the sections of the Natives Land Act:
Section 1
Defines that land outside the scheduled native areas, except by approval of the Governor-General, and until parliament acts on the commission's report, no Black African could purchase, hire or acquire land etc. other than from another Black African nor could a person who wasn't a Black African purchase, hire or acquire land, etc. from a Black African. This also applied to land within native areas and any exceptions made by the Governor-general was to be tabled in both houses of parliament. All agreement and transactions were null and void ab initio.
Section 2
Defines the appointment, by the Governor-General, of a commission after the commencement of the Act, that would inquire and report on areas where Black African shall not be permitted to acquire or hire land or have interests in land and likewise set aside areas where non-Black Africans were not permitted to acquire or hire land or have interests in land. The reports would include boundaries and maps. The commission had two years to report back to parliament.
Section 3
Defines the make-up of the commission as no less than five people with the ability to appoint persons to assist them and set procedures. Final reports and recommendations were considered accepted if the majority of the commission agreed with the decision. Defines the right of the commission or its representatives to enter any land, obtain any document needed, without fee or charge in order to carry out its inquires.
Section 4
Defines the ability of the Governor-General to use money allocated by parliament, to acquire any land or interest in land as described in section 2 and defines the laws to be used to expropriate land.
Section 5
Defines the fines or imprisonment for a person who attempted to purchase, sale, hire or lease land, or any agreement or transaction which is in contravention of the Act. Applied to companies and corporations to with the directors, managers, and corporate secretary's liable for prosecution and punishment.
Section 6
Defines that the Act will be used in addition to other laws governing Black African land ownership but if in conflict, it defined when this Act would supersede other laws.
Section 7
Defines what provisions of Orange Free State Law Book and Law No. 4 of 1895 remain in force as well as article twenty of Law No. 4 of 1895 of the Orange Free State.
Section 8
Defines when and where the Acts does not affect current laws of land purchase, sale and transfer, ownership and mortgages. Made provisions for the Cape Province where a non-white person could be a registered voter based on land ownership.
Section 9
Defines the right of the Governor-general to create regulations to manage sanitation for native areas not managed by a local authority. 
Section 10
Defined the meanings of common words within the Act. Special emphasis was given to defining the meaning of a who is a Black African farm labourer and who isn't, something the former would have to prove himself if in court. Other emphasis was given to defining who is a person who hires land in relation to the Act.
Section 11
Defined the name of the Act.

Social and Economic impact
According to the paragraph 'The impact of the Land Act', in this reference:

"Perhaps the most visible impact of the Act was that it denied Africans access to land which they owned or had been leasing from White farmers."

As outlined in the account of the deputation made to the then Minister of Justice of South Africa, Jacobus Wilhelmus Sauer, in the paragraph 'Responses to the Land Act' of the same reference:

"Also in May 1913 the SANNC sent a deputation to Jacobus Wilhelmus Sauer to persuade him to not proceed with the bill which would make Africans squatters and render them homeless."

Responses
The opposition was modest but vocal. John Dube used his newspaper to create an issue. As president of what would become the African National Congress, he supported whites like William Cullen Wilcox, who had created the Zululand Industrial Improvement Company. That had led to them supplying land to thousands of black people in Natal. Dube was one of six people who were sent to Britain to try to overturn the law once it came into force in South Africa.

A viewpoint somewhat irreconcilable with the view expressed in the preceding paragraph, is that expressed in the paragraph 'Responses to the Land Act ' in this South African History Online reference:
"The Natives Land Act sparked fierce opposition particularly by Black African people..."
The paragraph goes on to outline criticism of the Act, followed by organised protests:
"Between 28 February and 26 April 1913 African leaders continued criticism of the Land Bill in columns of newspapers. However, this changed dramatically after the first reading of the bill on 25 February. Protest meetings were organised in various parts of the country. On 9 May the first major protest meeting was organised by the SANNC at the Masonic Hall in St. James, Cape Town."
Furthermore, there was the deputation to Jacobus Wilhelmus Sauer, as already mentioned in the paragraph entitled 'Impact' above.

Sol Plaatje traveled to Britain with the SANNC (later the African National Congress) to protest against the Natives Land Act but to no avail. He collected transcripts of court deliberations on the Natives Land Act and testimonies from those directly subject to the act in the 1916 Book Native Life in South Africa.

Political ironies
Much political irony surrounded the Act:
 The minister at the time of its introduction, J.W. Sauer, was a Cape Liberal who opposed disenfranchisement of blacks. He, however, advocated for "separate residential areas for Whites and Natives" in the Parliamentary debate on the bill.
 John Tengo Jabavu, a prominent "educated African" welcomed the Act, but John X. Merriman and William Schreiner opposed the Act on principle.

Reflections 
History of South Africa (1910–1948)
South Africa under apartheid

References

Bibliography

L.M. Thompson, A History of South Africa

External links
 Text: Natives' Land Act
 1913 Land Act (Google Cultural Institute)

Apartheid laws in South Africa
1913 in South African law
June 1913 events